Ophiusa conspicienda  is a moth of the family Erebidae. It is found in West Africa, Gabon and Uganda.

References

Ophiusa
Moths of Africa
Insects of West Africa
Insects of Uganda
Moths described in 1858